The Tórshavn Theater Society is a theater association in Tórshavn in the Faroe Islands. The society operates the Tórshavn Theater, which was designed and built by H. C. W. Tórgarð in 1926. Tórgarð also became the society's first chairman in 1918. The Tórshavn Theater is also rented out for events.

Chairpersons
 H. C .W. Tórgarð 1918–1924
 H. M. Jacobsen 1924–1928
 Rikard Long 1928–1930
 Hans A. Djurhuus 1930–1951
 J. C. Olsen 1951–1963
 Poul Johs. Lindberg 1963–1967
 Knút Wang 1967–1974
 Oskar Hermansson 1974–1980
 Olivur Næss 1980–1988
 Gulla Øregaard 1988–1989
 Oddvá Nattestad 1989–1991
 Kári Petersen 1991–1993
 Bjørgfinnur Nielsen 1993–1993
 Margreta Næss 1993–1996
 Heðin Mortensen 1996–2000
 Jytte Joensen 2003–2010
 Karin Djurhuus 2010–

References

External links 
 Tórshavn Theater Society homepage

Faroese culture
Tórshavn
Theatre companies in Denmark
1918 in the Faroe Islands
Arts organizations established in 1918
1918 establishments in Denmark